Brian Gottfried and Raúl Ramírez were the defending champions, but they played in the Buckeye Classic this year.
Patricio Cornejo and Jaime Fillol claimed the title following victory over Dick Crealy and Cliff Letcher in the final. Crealy and Letcher were denied their prize money because their late appearance had caused the final to be delayed.

Seeds
A champion seed is indicated in bold text while text in italics indicates the round in which that seed was eliminated.

Draw

Finals

Top half

Bottom half

References

External links

U.S. Clay Court Championships
1977 U.S. Clay Court Championships